Intel Core is a line of streamlined midrange consumer, workstation and enthusiast computer central processing units (CPUs) marketed by Intel Corporation. These processors displaced the existing mid- to high-end Pentium processors at the time of their introduction, moving the Pentium to the entry level. Identical or more capable versions of Core processors are also sold as Xeon processors for the server and workstation markets.

The lineup of Core processors includes the Intel Core i3, Intel Core i5, Intel Core i7, and Intel Core i9, along with the X-series of Intel Core CPUs.

Overview
Although Intel Core is a brand that promises no internal consistency or continuity, the processors within this family have been, for the most part, broadly similar.

The first products receiving this designation were the Core Solo and Core Duo Yonah processors for mobile from the Pentium M design tree, fabricated at 65 nm and brought to market in January 2006. These are substantially different in design than the rest of the Intel Core product group, having derived from the Pentium Pro lineage that predated Pentium 4.

The first Intel Core desktop processor—and typical family member—came from the Conroe iteration, a 65 nm dual-core design brought to market in July 2006, based on the Intel Core microarchitecture with substantial enhancements in micro-architectural efficiency and performance, outperforming Pentium 4 across the board (or near to it), while operating at drastically lower clock rates. Maintaining high instructions per cycle (IPC) on a deeply pipelined and resourced out-of-order execution engine has remained a constant fixture of the Intel Core product group ever since.

The new substantial bump in microarchitecture came with the introduction of the 45 nm Bloomfield desktop processor in November 2008 on the Nehalem architecture, whose main advantage came from redesigned I/O and memory systems featuring the new Intel QuickPath Interconnect and an integrated memory controller supporting up to three channels of DDR3 memory.

Subsequent performance improvements have tended toward making additions rather than profound changes, such as adding the Advanced Vector Extensions instruction set extensions to Sandy Bridge, first released on 32 nm in January 2011. Time has also brought improved support for virtualization and a trend toward higher levels of system integration and management functionality (and along with that, increased performance) through the ongoing evolution of facilities such as Intel Active Management Technology.

Since 2019, the Core brand has been based on four product lines, consisting of the entry level i3, the mainstream i5, the high-end i7, and the "enthusiast" i9.

History

Core

The original Core brand refers to Intel's 32-bit mobile dual-core x86 CPUs, which derived from the Pentium M branded processors. The processor family used an enhanced version of the Intel P6 microarchitecture. It emerged in parallel with the NetBurst microarchitecture (Intel P68) of the Pentium 4 brand, and was a precursor of the 64-bit Core microarchitecture of Core 2 branded CPUs. The Core brand had two branches: the Duo (dual-core) and Solo (Duo with one disabled core, which replaced the Pentium M brand of single-core mobile processor). Intel launched the Core brand on January 6, 2006, with the release of the 32-bit Yonah CPU Intel's first dual-core mobile (low-power) processor. Its dual-core layout closely resembled two interconnected Pentium M branded CPUs packaged as a single die (piece) silicon chip (IC). Hence, the 32-bit microarchitecture of Core branded CPUs contrary to its name had more in common with Pentium M branded CPUs than with the subsequent 64-bit Core microarchitecture of Core 2 branded CPUs. Despite a major rebranding effort by Intel starting January 2006, some companies continued to market computers with the Yonah core marked as Pentium M. The Core series is also the first Intel processor used as the main CPU in an Apple Macintosh computer. The Core Duo was the CPU for the first generation MacBook Pro, while the Core Solo appeared in Apple's Mac Mini line. Core Duo signified the beginning of Apple's shift to Intel processors across the entire Mac line. In 2007, Intel began branding the Yonah core CPUs intended for mainstream mobile computers as Pentium Dual-Core, not to be confused with the desktop 64-bit Core microarchitecture CPUs also branded as Pentium Dual-Core. September 2007 and January 4, 2008, marked the discontinuation of a number of Core branded CPUs including several Core Solo, Core Duo, Celeron and one Core 2 Quad chip.

Intel Core Solo uses the same two-core die as the Core Duo, but features only one active core. Depending on demand, Intel may also simply disable one of the cores to sell the chip at the Core Solo price—this requires less effort than launching and maintaining a separate line of CPUs that physically only have one core. Intel had used the same strategy previously with the 486 CPU in which early 486SX CPUs were in fact manufactured as 486DX CPUs but with the FPU disabled. Intel Core Duo consists of two cores on one die, a 2 MB L2 cache shared by both cores, and an arbiter bus that controls both L2 cache and FSB (front-side bus) access.

Core 2 

The successor to Core is the mobile version of the Intel Core 2 line of processors using cores based upon the Intel Core microarchitecture, released on July 27, 2006. The release of the mobile version of Intel Core 2 marks the reunification of Intel's desktop and mobile product lines as Core 2 processors were released for desktops and notebooks, unlike the first Intel Core CPUs that were targeted only for notebooks (although some small form factor and all-in-one desktops, like the iMac and the Mac Mini, also used Core processors).

Unlike the Intel Core, Intel Core 2 is a 64-bit processor, supporting Intel 64. Another difference between the original Core Duo and the new Core 2 Duo is an increase in the amount of Level 2 cache. The new Core 2 Duo has tripled the amount of on-board cache to 6 MB. Core 2 also introduced a quad-core performance variant to the single- and dual-core chips, branded Core 2 Quad, as well as an enthusiast variant, Core 2 Extreme. All three chips are manufactured at a 65 nm lithography, and in 2008, a 45 nm lithography and support Front Side Bus speeds ranging from 533 MHz to 1600 MHz. In addition, the 45 nm die shrink of the Core microarchitecture adds SSE4.1 support to all Core 2 microprocessors manufactured at a 45 nm lithography, therefore increasing the calculation rate of the processors.

Core 2 Solo
The Core 2 Solo, introduced in September 2007, is the successor to the Core Solo and is available only as an ultra-low-power mobile processor with 5.5 Watt thermal design power. The original U2xxx series "Merom-L" used a special version of the Merom chip with CPUID number 10661 (model 22, stepping A1) that only had a single core and was also used in some Celeron processors.
The later SU3xxx are part of Intel's CULV range of processors in a smaller μFC-BGA 956 package but contain the same Penryn chip as the dual-core variants, with one of the cores disabled during manufacturing.

Core 2 Duo

The majority of the desktop and mobile Core 2 processor variants are Core 2 Duo with two processor cores on a single Merom, Conroe, Allendale, Penryn, or Wolfdale chip. These come in a wide range of performance and power consumption, starting with the relatively slow ultra-low-power Uxxxx (10 W) and low-power Lxxxx (17 W) versions, to the more performance oriented Pxxxx (25 W) and Txxxx (35 W) mobile versions and the Exxxx (65 W) desktop models. The mobile Core 2 Duo processors with an 'S' prefix in the name are produced in a smaller μFC-BGA 956 package, which allows building more compact laptops.

Within each line, a higher number usually refers to a better performance, which depends largely on core and front-side bus clock frequency and amount of second level cache, which are model-specific. Core 2 Duo processors typically use the full L2 cache of 2, 3, 4, or 6 MB available in the specific stepping of the chip, while versions with the amount of cache reduced during manufacturing are sold for the low-end consumer market as Celeron or Pentium Dual-Core processors. Like those processors, some low-end Core 2 Duo models disable features such as Intel Virtualization Technology.

Core 2 Quad
Core 2 Quad processors are multi-chip modules consisting of two dies similar to those used in Core 2 Duo, forming a quad-core processor. This allows twice the performance of a dual-core processors at the same clock frequency in ideal conditions.

Initially, all Core 2 Quad models were versions of Core 2 Duo desktop processors, Kentsfield derived from Conroe and Yorkfield from Wolfdale, but later Penryn-QC was added as a high-end version of the mobile dual-core Penryn.

The Xeon 32xx and 33xx processors are mostly identical versions of the desktop Core 2 Quad processors and can be used interchangeably.

Core 2 Extreme
Core 2 Extreme processors are enthusiast versions of Core 2 Duo and Core 2 Quad processors, usually with a higher clock frequency and an unlocked clock multiplier, which makes them especially attractive for overclocking. This is similar to earlier Pentium processors labeled as Extreme Edition. Core 2 Extreme processors were released at a much higher price than their regular version, often $999 or more.

1st generation 

With the release of the Nehalem microarchitecture in November 2008, Intel introduced a new naming scheme for its Core processors. There are three variants, Core i3, Core i5 and Core i7, but the names no longer correspond to specific technical features like the number of cores. Instead, the brand is now divided from low-level (i3), through mid-range (i5) to high-end performance (i7), which correspond to three, four and five stars in Intel's Intel Processor Rating following on from the entry-level Celeron (one star) and Pentium (two stars) processors. Common features of all Nehalem based processors include an integrated DDR3 memory controller as well as QuickPath Interconnect or PCI Express and Direct Media Interface on the processor replacing the aging quad-pumped Front Side Bus used in all earlier Core processors. All these processors have 256 KB L2 cache per core, plus up to 12 MB shared L3 cache. Because of the new I/O interconnect, chipsets and mainboards from previous generations can no longer be used with Nehalem-based processors.

Intel intended the Core i3 as the new low end of the performance processor line from Intel, following the retirement of the Core 2 brand. The first Core i3 processors were launched on January 7, 2010. The first Nehalem based Core i3 was Clarkdale-based, with an integrated GPU and two cores. The same processor is also available as Core i5 and Pentium, with slightly different configurations. The Core i3-3xxM processors are based on Arrandale, the mobile version of the Clarkdale desktop processor. They are similar to the Core i5-4xx series but running at lower clock speeds and without Turbo Boost. According to an Intel FAQ they do not support Error Correction Code (ECC) memory. According to motherboard manufacturer Supermicro, if a Core i3 processor is used with a server chipset platform such as Intel 3400/3420/3450, the CPU supports ECC with UDIMM. When asked, Intel confirmed that, although the Intel 5 series chipset supports non-ECC memory only with the Core i5 or i3 processors, using those processors on a motherboard with 3400 series chipsets it supports the ECC function of ECC memory. A limited number of motherboards by other companies also support ECC with Intel Core ix processors; the Asus P8B WS is an example, but it does not support ECC memory under Windows non-server operating systems.

Lynnfield was the first Core i5 processors using the Nehalem microarchitecture, introduced on September 8, 2009, as a mainstream variant of the earlier Core i7. Lynnfield Core i5 processors have an 8 MB L3 cache, a DMI bus running at 2.5 GT/s and support for dual-channel DDR3-800/1066/1333 memory and have Hyper-threading disabled. The same processors with different sets of features (Hyper-threading and other clock frequencies) enabled are sold as Core i7-8xx and Xeon 3400-series processors, which should not be confused with high-end Core i7-9xx and Xeon 3500-series processors based on Bloomfield. A new feature called Turbo Boost Technology was introduced which maximizes speed for demanding applications, dynamically accelerating performance to match the workload. After Nehalem received a 32 nm Westmere die shrink, Arrandale, the dual-core mobile Core i5 processors and its desktop counterpart Clarkdale was introduced in January 2010, together with Core i7-6xx and Core i3-3xx processors based on the same architecture. Arrandale processors have integrated graphics capability. Core i3-3xx does not support for Turbo Boost, L3 cache in Core i5-5xx processors is reduced to 3 MB, while the Core i5-6xx uses the full cache, Clarkdale is sold as Core i5-6xx, along with related Core i3 and Pentium processors. It has Hyper-Threading enabled and the full 4 MB L3 cache. According to Intel "Core i5 desktop processors and desktop boards typically do not support ECC memory", but information on limited ECC support in the Core i3 section also applies to Core i5 and i7.

Intel Core i7 as an Intel brand name applies to several families of desktop and laptop 64-bit x86-64 processors using the Nehalem, Westmere, Sandy Bridge, Ivy Bridge, Haswell, Broadwell, Skylake, and Kaby Lake microarchitectures. The Core i7 brand targets the business and high-end consumer markets for both desktop and laptop computers, and is distinguished from the Core i3 (entry-level consumer), Core i5 (mainstream consumer), and Xeon (server and workstation) brands. Introduced in late 2008, Bloomfield was the first Core i7 processors based on the Nehalem architecture. The following year, Lynnfield desktop processors and Clarksfield mobile processors brought new quad-core Core i7 models based on the said architecture. After Nehalem received a 32 nm Westmere die shrink, Arrandale dual-core mobile processors were introduced in January 2010, followed by Core i7's first six-core desktop processor Gulftown on March 16, 2010. Both the regular Core i7 and the Extreme Edition are advertised as five stars in the Intel Processor Rating. The first-generation Core i7 uses two different sockets; LGA 1366 designed for high-end desktops and servers, and LGA 1156 used in low- and mid-end desktops and servers. In each generation, the highest-performing Core i7 processors use the same socket and QPI-based architecture as the medium-end Xeon processors of that generation, while lower-performing Core i7 processors use the same socket and PCIe/DMI/FDI architecture as the Core i5. "Core i7" is a successor to the Intel Core 2 brand. Intel representatives stated that they intended the moniker Core i7 to help consumers decide which processor to purchase as Intel releases newer Nehalem-based products in the future.

2nd generation 

In early 2011, Intel introduced a new microarchitecture named Sandy Bridge. This is the second generation of the Core processor microarchitecture. It kept all the existing brands from Nehalem, including Core i3/i5/i7, and introduced new model numbers. The initial set of Sandy Bridge processors includes dual- and quad-core variants, all of which use a single 32 nm die for both the CPU and integrated GPU cores, unlike the earlier microarchitectures. All Core i3/i5/i7 processors with the Sandy Bridge microarchitecture have a four-digit model number. With the mobile version, the thermal design power can no longer be determined from a one- or two-letter suffix but is encoded into the CPU number. Starting with Sandy Bridge, Intel no longer distinguishes the code names of the processor based on number of cores, socket or intended usage; they all use the same code name as the microarchitecture itself.

Ivy Bridge is the codename for Intel's 22 nm die shrink of the Sandy Bridge microarchitecture based on tri-gate ("3D") transistors, introduced in April 2012.

 Core i3

Released on January 20, 2011, the Core i3-2xxx line of desktop and mobile processors is a direct replacement of the 2010 "Clarkdale" Core i3-5xx and "Arrandale" Core i3-3xxM models, based on the new microarchitecture. While they require new sockets and chipsets, the user-visible features of the Core i3 are largely unchanged, including the lack of support for Turbo Boost and AES-NI. Unlike the Sandy Bridge-based Celeron and Pentium processors, the Core i3 line does support the new Advanced Vector Extensions. This particular processor is the entry-level processor of this new series of Intel processors.

 Core i5
In January 2011, Intel released new quad-core Core i5 processors based on the "Sandy Bridge" microarchitecture at CES 2011. New dual-core mobile processors and desktop processors arrived in February 2011.

The Core i5-2xxx line of desktop processors are mostly quad-core chips, with the exception of the dual-core Core i5-2390T, and include integrated graphics, combining the key features of the earlier Core i5-6xx and Core i5-7xx lines. The suffix after the four-digit model number designates unlocked multiplier (K), low-power (S) and ultra-low-power (T).

The desktop CPUs now all have four non-SMT cores (like the i5-750), with the exception of the i5-2390T. The DMI bus runs at 5 GT/s.

The mobile Core i5-2xxxM processors are all dual-core and hyper-threaded chips like the previous Core i5-5xxM series, and share most of the features with that product line.

 Core i7

The Core i7 brand was the high-end for Intel's desktop and mobile processors, until the announcement of the i9 in 2017. Its Sandy Bridge models feature the largest amount of L3 cache and the highest clock frequency. Most of these models are very similar to their smaller Core i5 siblings. The quad-core mobile Core i7-2xxxQM/XM processors follow the previous "Clarksfield" Core i7-xxxQM/XM processors, but now also include integrated graphics.

3rd generation 

Ivy Bridge is the codename for a "third generation" line of processors based on the 22 nm manufacturing process developed by Intel. Mobile versions of the CPU were released in April 2012 following with desktop versions in September 2012.

 Core i3

The Ivy Bridge-based Core-i3-3xxx line is a minor upgrade to 22 nm process technology and better graphics.

 Core i5

 Core i7

4th generation 

Haswell is the fourth generation Core processor microarchitecture, and was released in 2013.

 Core i3

 Core i5

 Core i7

5th generation 

Broadwell is the fifth generation Core processor microarchitecture, and was released by Intel on September 6, 2014, and began shipping in late 2014. It is the first to use a 14 nm chip. Additionally, mobile processors were launched in January 2015 and Desktop Core i5 and i7 processors were released in June 2015.

Desktop processor (DT-Series)

Mobile processors (U-Series)

Mobile Processors (Y-Series)

6th generation

Broadwell microarchitecture

Skylake microarchitecture 

Skylake is the sixth generation Core processor microarchitecture, and was launched in August 2015. Being the successor to the Broadwell line, it is a redesign using the same 14 nm manufacturing process technology; however the redesign has better CPU and GPU performance and reduced power consumption. Intel also disabled overclocking non -K processors.

7th generation

Skylake microarchitecture

Kaby Lake 

Kaby Lake is the codename for the seventh generation Core processor, and was launched in October 2016 (mobile chips) and January 2017 (desktop chips). With the latest generation of microarchitecture, Intel decided to produce Kaby Lake processors without using their "tick–tock" manufacturing and design model. Kaby Lake features the same Skylake microarchitecture and is fabricated using Intel's 14 nanometer manufacturing process technology.

Built on an improved 14 nm process (14FF+), Kaby Lake features faster CPU clock speeds and Turbo frequencies. Beyond these process and clock speed changes, little of the CPU architecture has changed from Skylake, resulting in identical IPC.

Kaby Lake features a new graphics architecture to improve performance in 3D graphics and 4K video playback. It adds native High-bandwidth Digital Content Protection 2.2 support, along with fixed function decode of H.264/MPEG-4 AVC, High Efficiency Video Coding Main and Main10/10-bit, and VP9 10-bit and 8-bit video. Hardware encode is supported for H.264/MPEG-4 AVC, HEVC Main10/10-bit, and VP9 8-bit video. VP9 10-bit encode is not supported in hardware. OpenCL 2.1 is now supported.

Kaby Lake is the first Core architecture to support hyper-threading for the Pentium-branded desktop CPU SKU. Kaby Lake also features the first overclocking-enabled i3-branded CPU.

Features common to desktop Kaby Lake CPUs:
 LGA 1151 socket
 DMI 3.0 and PCIe 3.0 interfaces
 Dual channel memory support in the following configurations: DDR3L-1600 1.35 V (32 GiB maximum) or DDR4-2400 1.2 V (64 GiB maximum)
 A total of 16 PCIe lanes
 The Core-branded processors support the AVX2 instruction set. The Celeron and Pentium-branded ones support only SSE4.1/4.2
 350 MHz base graphics clock rate
 No L4 cache (eDRAM).
 A release date of January 3, 2017

Kaby Lake-X processors are modified versions of Kaby Lake-S processors that fit into the LGA 2066 socket. However, they can't take advantage of the unique features of the platform.

8th generation

Kaby Lake Refresh

Coffee Lake microarchitecture 

Coffee Lake is a codename for the eighth generation Intel Core family and was launched in October 2017. For the first time in the ten-year history of Intel Core processors, the Coffee Lake generation features an increase in core counts across the desktop lineup of processors, a significant driver of improved performance versus previous generations despite similar per-clock performance.

* Intel Hyper-threading capabilities allow an enabled processor to execute two threads per physical core

Coffee Lake features largely the same CPU core and performance per MHz as Skylake/Kaby Lake. Features specific to Coffee Lake include:
 Following similar refinements to the 14 nm process in Skylake and Kaby Lake, Coffee Lake is the third 14 nm process refinement ("14nm++") and features increased transistor gate pitch for a lower current density and higher leakage transistors which allows higher peak power and higher frequency at the expense of die area and idle power.
 Coffee Lake will be used in conjunction with the 300-series chipset and is incompatible with the older 100- and 200-series chipsets.
 Increased L3 cache in accordance to the number of cores
 Increased turbo clock speeds across i5 and i7 CPUs models (increased by up to 200 MHz)
 Increased iGPU clock speeds by 50 MHz
 DDR4 memory support updated for 2666 MHz (for i5 and i7 parts) and 2400 MHz (for i3 parts); DDR3 memory is no longer supported

* Processors Core i3-8100 and Core i3-8350K with stepping B0 actually belong to "Kaby Lake-S" family

Amber Lake microarchitecture 
Amber Lake is a refinement over the low power Mobile Kaby Lake CPUs.

Whiskey Lake microarchitecture 

Whiskey Lake is Intel's codename for the third 14 nm Skylake process-refinement, following Kaby Lake Refresh and Coffee Lake. Intel announced low power mobile Whiskey Lake CPUs availability on August 28, 2018. It has not yet been advertised whether this CPU architecture contains hardware mitigations for Meltdown/Spectre class vulnerabilities—various sources contain conflicting information. Unofficially it was announced that Whiskey Lake has hardware mitigations against Meltdown and L1TF while Spectre V2 requires software mitigations as well as microcode/firmware update.

Architecture changes compared to Kaby Lake Refresh 
 14++ nm process, same as Coffee Lake
 Increased turbo clocks (300–600 MHz)
 14 nm PCH
 Native USB 3.1 gen 2 support (10 Gbit/s)
 Integrated 802.11ac 160 MHz Wi-Fi and Bluetooth 5.0
 Intel Optane Memory support

Cannon Lake microarchitecture 

Cannon Lake (formerly Skymont) is Intel's codename for the 10-nanometer die shrink of the Kaby Lake microarchitecture. As a die shrink, Cannon Lake is a new process in Intel's "process–architecture–optimization" execution plan as the next step in semiconductor fabrication. Cannon Lake are the first mainstream CPUs to include the AVX-512 instruction set. In comparison to the previous generation AVX2 (AVX-256), the new generation AVX-512 most notably provides double the width of data registers and double the number of registers. These enhancements would allow for twice the number of floating point operations per register due to the increased width in addition to doubling the overall number of registers, resulting in theoretical performance improvements of up to four times the performance of AVX2.

At CES 2018, Intel announced that they had started shipping mobile Cannon Lake CPUs at the end of 2017 and that they would ramp up production in 2018. No further details were disclosed.

Architecture changes compared to Coffee Lake 
 AVX-512 instruction set extension
Intel's first 10 nm process technology

Mobile processors (U-Series)

9th generation

Skylake microarchitecture 
The 9th generation Skylake CPUs are updated versions of previous Skylake X-Series CPUs with clockspeed improvements.

Coffee Lake Refresh microarchitecture 
The 9th generation Coffee Lake CPUs were released in the fourth quarter of 2018. They include hardware mitigations against certain Meltdown/Spectre vulnerabilities.

For the first time in Intel consumer CPU history, these CPUs support up to 128 GB RAM.

* Intel Hyper-threading capabilities allow an enabled processor to execute two threads per physical core

Even though the F suffix CPUs lack an integrated GPU, Intel set the same price for these CPUs as their featureful counterparts.

* various reviews show that the Core i9 9900K CPU may consume over 140 W under load. The Core i9 9900KS may consume even more.

10th generation

Cascade Lake microarchitecture 
Cascade Lake X-Series CPUs are the 10th generation versions of the previous Skylake X-Series CPUs. They offer minor clockspeed improvements and a highly reduced price.

Ice Lake microarchitecture 

Ice Lake is codename for Intel's 10th generation Intel Core processors, representing an enhancement of the 'Architecture' of the preceding generation Kaby Lake/Cannon Lake processors (as specified in Intel's process–architecture–optimization execution plan). As the successor to Cannon Lake, Ice Lake uses Intel's newer 10 nm+ fabrication process, and is powered by the Sunny Cove microarchitecture.

Ice Lake are the first Intel CPUs to feature in-silicon mitigations for the hardware vulnerabilities discovered in 2017, Meltdown and Spectre. These side-channel attacks exploit branch prediction's use of speculative execution. These exploits may cause the CPU to reveal cached private information which the exploiting process is not intended to be able to access as a form of timing attack.

Features

CPU 
 On average 18% increase in IPC in comparison to 2015 Skylake running at the same frequency and memory configuration
 L1 instruction/data cache: 32 KB / 48 KiB; L2 cache: 512 KiB
 Dynamic Tuning 2.0 which allows the CPU to stay at turbo frequencies for longer
 Six new AVX-512 instruction subsets: VPOPCNTDQ, VBMI2, BITALG, VPCLMULQDQ, GFNI, and VAES
AI tasks acceleration, Intel Deep Learning Boost

GPU 
 Gen 11 GPU with up to 64 execution units; 4K@120 Hz, 5K, 8K display output
Variable Rate Shading
 DisplayPort 1.4a with Display Stream Compression; HDMI 2.0b
 Up to 1.15 TFLOPS of computational performance
Two HEVC 10-bit encode pipelines, either two 4K60 4:4:4 streams simultaneously or one 8K30 4:2:2

Package 
 10 nm+ transistors
 New memory controller with DDR4 3200 and LPDDR4X 3733 support
 Integrated support for Wi-Fi 6 (802.11ax)
 Thunderbolt 3 support

Mobile processors (U-Series)

Mobile processors (Y-Series)

Comet Lake microarchitecture 

Comet Lake is Intel's codename for the fourth 14 nm Skylake process-refinement, following Whiskey Lake. Intel announced low power mobile Comet Lake CPUs availability on August 21, 2019.

Architecture changes in Comet Lake-U compared to Whiskey Lake 
 Up to six CPU cores; L3 cache up to 12 MiB
Higher turbo frequencies
LPDDR4x 2933 memory support
Wi-Fi 6 AX201 support (Depends on PCH chipset)

Desktop processors (S-Series)

Mobile processors (H-Series)

Mobile processors (U-Series)

Comet Lake Refresh microarchitecture

Amber Lake Refresh microarchitecture

11th generation

Tiger Lake 

Launched on September 2, 2020.

Architecture changes compared to Ice Lake

CPU
 Intel Willow Cove CPU cores
 Larger level two and level three (L2/L3) caches
 A new AVX-512 instruction: Vector Pair Intersection to a Pair of Mask Registers, VP2INTERSECT
 Control Flow Enforcement Technology to prevent Return Oriented Programming and Jump Oriented Programming hacking techniques
 Full memory (RAM) encryption
 Indirect branch tracking and shadow stack
 Intel Key Locker
AVX/AVX2 instructions support for Pentium Gold and Celeron processors has been unlocked

GPU
 Intel Xe-LP ("Gen12") GPU with up to 96 execution units (50% uplift compared to Ice Lake) with some yet to be announced processors using Intel's discrete GPU, DG1
 Fixed-function hardware decoding for High Efficiency Video Coding 12-bit, 4:2:2/4:4:4; VP9 12-bit 4:4:4 and AV1 8K 10-bit 4:2:0
 Support for a single 8K 12-bit High-dynamic-range video display or two 4K resolution 10-bit HDR displays
 Hardware accelerated Dolby Vision
 Sampler Feedback support

I/O
 PCI Express 4.0 (Pentium and Celeron CPUs are limited to PCI Express 3.0)
 Thunderbolt 4 (includes USB4)
 LPDDR4X-4267 memory support
 LPDDR5-5400 "architecture capability" (Intel expects Tiger Lake products with LPDDR5 to be available around Q1 2021) Designs with LPDDR5 memory are yet to be announced as of March 2022.
Miniaturization of CPU and motherboard into an M.2 SSD-sized small circuit board

Mobile processors (Tiger Lake-H) 
 All models support DDR4-3200 memory
 All models support 20 reconfigurable PCI Express 4.0 lanes, allowing x16 Gen 4 link for discrete GPU and x4 Gen 4 link for M.2 SSDs

Mobile processors (Tiger Lake-H35) 

 All models support DDR4-3200 or LPDDR4X-4267 memory

Mobile processors (UP3-class)

Embedded mobile processors (UP3-class)

Mobile processors (UP4-class)

Desktop/tablet processors (Tiger Lake-B) 

 Socket: FCBGA1787, a BGA socket, thus these CPUs are meant only for system integrators
Intel Xe UHD Graphics
 Up to 128 GB DDR4-3200 memory
 Was initially incorrectly listed as having a 5.3 GHz TVB boost frequency.

Rocket Lake microarchitecture 

Rocket Lake is a codename for Intel's desktop x86 chip family based on the new Cypress Cove microarchitecture, a variant of Sunny Cove (used by Intel's Ice Lake mobile processors) backported to the older 14 nm process. The chips are marketed as "Intel 11th generation Core". Launched March 30, 2021.

Architecture changes in comparison with Comet Lake

CPU
 Intel Cypress Cove CPU cores
 Up to 19% claimed increase in IPC (instructions-per-clock)
 DL Boost (low-precision arithmetic for Deep Learning) and AVX-512 instructions
 Compared to its predecessors, SGX instruction set extensions are removed

GPU
 Intel Xe-LP ("Gen12") GPU with up to 32 execution units
 Fixed-function hardware decoding for HEVC 12-bit, 4:2:2/4:4:4; VP9 12-bit 4:4:4 and AV1 8K 10-bit 4:2:0
 DisplayPort 1.4a with Display Stream Compression; HDMI 2.0b
 Support for a single 8K 12-bit HDR display or two 4K 10-bit HDR displays
 Hardware accelerated Dolby Vision
 Sampler Feedback support
 Dual Queue Support
 Variable Rate Shading
 Integer- and nearest neighbor image scaling
 GPUs on desktop CPUs support 5K 60 Hz

I/O
 Up to 20 CPU lanes of PCI Express 4.0
 DDR4-3200 memory support
 USB 3.2 Gen 2×2
 Optional USB4 / Thunderbolt 4 when paired with Intel JHL8540 Thunderbolt 4 Controller
 DMI 3.0 x8 link with Intel 500 Series Chipsets

Desktop processors 

 All CPUs listed below support DDR4-3200 natively. The Core i9 K/KF processors enable a 1:1 ratio of DRAM to memory controller by default at DDR4-3200, whereas the Core i9 non K/KF and all other CPUs listed below enable a 2:1 ratio of DRAM to memory controller by default at DDR4-3200 and a 1:1 ratio by default at DDR4-2933.
 All CPUs support up to 128 GiB of RAM in dual channel mode
 Core i9 CPUs (except 11900T) support Intel Thermal Velocity Boost technology

12th generation

Alder Lake 

Alder Lake is Intel's codename for the 12th generation of Intel Core processors based on a hybrid architecture utilizing Golden Cove high-performance cores and Gracemont power-efficient cores.

It is fabricated using Intel's Intel 7 process, previously referred to as Intel 10 nm Enhanced SuperFin (10ESF).

Intel officially announced 12th Gen Intel Core CPUs on October 27, 2021, and was launched to the market on November 4, 2021.

Architecture changes in comparison to Rocket Lake

CPU

 Golden Cove high-performance "Performance-cores" (P-cores)
 Dedicated floating-point adders
 New 6-wide instruction decoder (up from 4-wide in Rocket Lake/Tiger Lake) with the ability to fetch up to 32 bytes of instructions per cycle (up from 16)
 12 execution ports (up from 10)
 512 reorder-buffer entries (up from 384)
 6-wide μOP allocations (up from 5)
 μOP cache size increased to 4K entries (up from 2.25K)
 AVX-VNNI, a VEX-coded variant of AVX512-VNNI for 256-bit vectors
 AVX-512 (including FP16) is present but disabled by default to match E-cores. It still can be enabled on some motherboards by disabling the E-cores 
 ~18% IPC uplift.
 Gracemont high-efficiency "Efficient-cores" (E-cores)
 E-cores are organized in 4-core modules; L2 cache is shared between E-cores within a module
 256 reorder-buffer entries (up from 208 in Tremont)
 17 execution ports (up from 12)
 AVX2, FMA and AVX-VNNI to catch up with P-cores
 Skylake-like IPC.
 new instruction set extensions
 up to 1 TB/s interconnect between cores 
 Intel Thread Director (Scalable Hybrid Arch Scheduling), a hardware technology to assist the OS thread scheduler with more efficient load distribution between heterogeneous CPU cores. Enabling this new capability requires support in operating systems. Microsoft added support for Thread Director to Windows 11, while support to Linux was merged in kernel 5.18.
 up to 30 MB L3 cache
 nomenclature:
 up to 8 P-cores and 8 E-cores on desktop
 up to 6 P-cores and 8 E-cores on mobile (UP3 designs)
 up to 2 P-cores and 8 E-cores on ultra mobile (UP4 designs)
 only P-cores feature Hyper-threading

GPU
 Intel Xe (Gen12.2) GPU
 up to 96 EU on mobile and 32 EU on desktop

I/O
 LGA 1700 socket for desktop processors
 BGA Type3 and Type4 HDI for mobile processors
 20 PCIe lanes from CPU
 16 PCIe 5.0 lanes
 4 PCIe 4.0 lanes
 Chipset link - DMI 4.0 x8 link with Intel 600 series PCH chipsets
 DDR5, DDR4, LPDDR5, and LPDDR4 memory support
 up to DDR4-3200
 up to DDR5-4800
 XMP 3.0
 Dynamic Memory Boost
 Integrated Thunderbolt 4 and WiFi 6E support

Desktop processors (Alder Lake-S) 
 All the CPUs support up to 128 GB of DDR4-3200 or DDR5-4800 RAM in dual channel mode.
 Some models feature integrated UHD Graphics 770, UHD Graphics 730 or UHD Graphics 710 GPU with 32/24/16 EUs and base frequency of 300 MHz.
 By default Alder Lake CPUs are configured to run at Turbo Power at all times and Base Power is only guaranteed when P-Cores/E-cores do not exceed the base clock rate.
 Max Turbo Power: the maximum sustained (> 1 s) power dissipation of the processor as limited by current and/or temperature controls. Instantaneous power may exceed Maximum Turbo Power for short durations (≤ 10 ms). Maximum Turbo Power is configurable by system vendor and can be system specific.
 CPUs in bold below feature ECC memory support only when paired with a motherboard based on the W680 chipset.

*By default, Core i9 12900KS achieves 5.5 GHz only when using Thermal Velocity Boost

Extreme-performance Mobile Processors (Alder Lake-HX) 
 Bold indicates ECC memory support

High-performance Mobile Processors (Alder Lake-H)

Low Power Performance Mobile Processors (Alder Lake-P)

Ultra Low Power Mobile Processors (Alder Lake-U)

13th generation 

Raptor Lake is Intel's codename for the 13th generation of Intel Core processors and the second generation based on a hybrid architecture.

It is fabricated using Intel's Intel 7 process.

Reception

Vulnerabilities
In early 2018, news reports indicated that security flaws, referred to as "Meltdown" and "Spectre", were found "in virtually all Intel processors [made in the past two decades] that will require fixes within Windows, macOS and Linux". The flaw also affected cloud servers. At the time, Intel was not commenting on this issue. According to a New York Times report, "There is no easy fix for Spectre ... as for Meltdown, the software patch needed to fix the issue could slow down computers by as much as 30 percent".

In mid 2018, the majority of Intel Core processors were found to possess a defect (the Foreshadow vulnerability), which undermines the Software Guard Extensions (SGX) feature of the processor. In March 2020, computer security experts reported another Intel chip security flaw, besides the Meltdown and Spectre flaws, with the systematic name  (or, "Intel CSME Bug", referencing the Converged Security and Management Engine). This newly found flaw is not fixable with a firmware update, and affects nearly "all Intel chips released in the past five years".

See also
Intel
Intel Core (microarchitecture)
List of Intel graphics processing units
List of Intel microprocessors
List of Intel Core i3 microprocessors
List of Intel Core i5 microprocessors
List of Intel Core i7 microprocessors
List of Intel Core i9 microprocessors
List of Intel chipsets
Ryzen
Zen (microarchitecture)

References

External links

CPU Database. TechPowerUp.
Intel Core Duo (Yonah) Performance Preview – Part II vs AMD 64 X2 and Intel Pentium M. Anandtech.
Intel Core i7-3960X CPU Performance Comparison.
Intel Centrino Duo Mobile Technology papers. Intel.
Intel Product Information, providing a list of various processor generations

Core
Computer-related introductions in 2006
64-bit microprocessors

de:Intel-Core-i-Serie